Stephensia jalmarella is a moth in the family Elachistidae. It was described by Lauri Kaila in 1992. It is found in the Altai Mountains.

References

Moths described in 1992
Elachistidae
Moths of Asia